Shanampudi Saidireddy (Telugu : శానంపూడి సైదిరెడ్డి  
(born 18 April 1974) is an Indian politician and present MLA for Huzurnagar assembly constituency representing the Telangana Rashtra Samithi. He became the MLA for Huzurnagar assembly constituency after defeating the Congress candidate by a record margin in the by election in 2019.

Early life 

Saidireddy was born on 18 April 1974 at Gundlapally village of Mattampally Mandal in Suryapet District to Anki Reddy and Sathyavathi and he has 2 siblings. He did his initial schooling in Mattampally and graduated in B.Sc. from Priyadarshini college in Huzurnagar.

Professional life 

Saidireddy emigrated to Jamaica after his graduation. After initially working as a lecturer he joined the United Nations population fund as an IT Manager. He later moved to Canada and set up a successful restaurant business.
He later started an Engineering college in Suryapet.

Political life 

Saidireddy returned to India in 2015. He started to work on social issues in Telangana and in his native Huzurnagar. He focused on youth development and women empowerment. He started a Youth organization under the name Sye which was very successful in mobilizing the youth in his native Huzurnagar. He was given the ticket to contest from TRS in 2018. He lost the election by a narrow margin of 7000 odd votes. However in the subsequent by election held in 2019 he was again nominated and he won with a record margin of 43,000 votes.

Personal life 

He is married to Rajitha Reddy who is also an entrepreneur. He has 2 children.

References 

1974 births
Living people
Telangana Rashtra Samithi politicians
Telugu politicians
Telangana MLAs 2018–2023